The Lethbridge Police Service, formerly known as the Lethbridge Regional Police Service, was established 1905, and serves the city of Lethbridge, a community in southern Alberta of approximately 101,482 in its 2019 municipal census.

History

The Lethbridge Police Force was established in 1902 with a staff of two constables and served a population of about 2,000. Thomas "the Just" Lewis was appointed the chief of police. In 2009, the police service employed 155 officers, 47 civilian staff and over 40 civilian volunteers, and served a population of 92,435. Two officers have been killed in the line of duty, Acting Sergeant Paul Smith in 1913 and Constable Cal Byam in 1964.

On May 4, 2020, a video of a 19-year-old woman dressed in a Star Wars stormtrooper uniform being taken down and arrested by Lethbridge police gained international attention.  The woman was carrying a toy Star Wars blaster on Star Wars Day in front of a Star Wars themed restaurant.  The Lethbridge Police Service and the Alberta Serious Incident Response Team initiated an investigation into the incident. The investigation concluded in December 2020, and resulted in no criminal charges against the involved officers. A further external investigation cleared the officers of any wrongdoing.

In July 2020, two members of the Lethbridge Police Service were demoted for inappropriately using their police jobs in 2017 to follow and photograph Alberta NDP MLA Shannon Phillips, then the Minister of Environment and Parks of Alberta. Phillips was in the process of meeting with stakeholders in the lead-up to the formation of Castle Provincial Park, where the two officers had an interest in off-road vehicle driving. One of the officers took photos of the meeting and ran a police check on the stakeholder; the photo was later published on Facebook under a pseudonym alongside criticism of the NDP government. After an investigation by the Medicine Hat Police Service, charges were laid against the two officers, who admitted to the misconduct charges.

Lethbridge Regional Police Commission

The service is governed by a nine-person commission composed of three members of the Lethbridge City Council and six citizens. The commission oversees the service, allocates funds from the council and establishes policing policies. They provide instruction to the police chief regarding sufficient staffing levels.

Organization

The head of the service is Chief Robert A. Davis, who has over 28 years of policing experience, primarily in Ontario. The executive officers heading the service's four divisions are Inspector Tom Ascroft, Inspector Colin Catonio, Inspector Jeff Cove, and Inspector Bill Kaye.

Rank

The rank structure consists of the following:

Training

As of 2005, newly hired officers must complete the Police Recruit Training Program through the Centre for Advancement in Community Justice, located at the Lethbridge College.

Structure

The organization of the police service includes four divisions: community policing, criminal investigation, administrative support and support services.

Community policing

The community policing division is mandated to maintain the peace, protect life and property, and the prevention and detection of crime. It is composed of the following units:

Patrol services
Downtown policing 
Traffic safety
Court liaison
Community resource 
Victim services

Criminal investigation

The criminal investigation division provides support services to ongoing investigations through the dissemination of intelligence and investigation assistance. Units in the division include:

Violent crime
Forensic identification
Crime analysis
Property crime
Serious habitual offenders
Special operations
Criminal intelligence
Economic crime
National weapons enforcement
Gaming and liquor enforcement

Administrative support

The administrative support division oversees the following areas:

Human resources
Professional standards
Policy and accreditation
Property and exhibits
Business management

Support services

The support services division provides support to all other divisions as required, including a specialized response to ongoing crises and ensuring the continuous flow of information. This division includes:

Public safety communications
Information technology
Records management
Tactical unit
Canine unit
Explosive disposal unit

Fleet

Patrol

Ford Taurus Police Interceptor Marked and Unmarked
Ford Crown Victoria Police Interceptor
Ford F-150 Pickup Truck
Ram 1500 Pickup Truck (marked and stealth units)
Chevrolet Silverado Pickup Truck
Dodge Charger New addition in 2019
Ford Transit van (downtown policing unit)

Traffic and photo radar

Ram 1500 pursuit pickup truck
Chevrolet Silverado pickup truck
Ford F-150 pickup truck
Buick Enclave SUV
Dodge Grand Caravan
Victory Commander I motorcycle

Special use

GMC Yukon (supervisor)
Chevrolet Impala (school resource officers)
Dodge Grand Caravan (forensics)
Ford Transit van (forensics)
Chevrolet Tahoe Marked and Stealth (canine)

Equipment
Officers were equipped with SIG Sauer P226 pistols in .40 S&W. In 2019, Lethbridge Police Service purchased Glock 17 Gen 5's in 9mm to replace the P226.

See also 
 Alberta Law Enforcement Response Teams

References

 https://www.lethbridgepolice.ca/sites/default/files/2017-Annual-Report.pdf

External links
Lethbridge Regional Police website

Law enforcement agencies of Alberta
Politics of Lethbridge